Drug war(s) may refer to:

Media
 Drug War (film), a Chinese-Hong Kong action thriller film
 Drug Wars: The Camarena Story, a 1990 TV mini-series based on Elaine Shannon's book Desperados and the Time article of the same name
 Drug Wars (video game), a turn-based strategy computer game

Real-world activities
 Bangladesh drug war, an ongoing campaign against alleged drug dealers and users by the government of Bangladesh
 Mexican drug war, an ongoing asymmetric low-intensity conflict between the Mexican government and various drug trafficking syndicates
 Miami drug war, a series of armed conflicts in the 1970s and 1980s
 Philippine drug war, the drug policy of the Philippine government under President Rodrigo Duterte
 War on drugs, a campaign, led by the U.S. federal government, of drug prohibition, military aid, and military intervention

See also
 War on Drugs (disambiguation)